The 2021–22 Tunisian Cup (Coupe de Tunisie) or Farhat Hached Cup was the 90th season of the football cup competition of Tunisia.
The competition was organized by the Fédération Tunisienne de Football (FTF) and open to all clubs in Tunisia.

First preliminary round

Second preliminary round

Round of 32
The draw for the round of 32 was held on 16 May 2022.

Round of 16
The draw for the round of 16 was held on 16 May 2022 (after the round of 32 draw).

Quarter-finals
The draw for the quarter-finals was held on 16 May 2022 (after the round of 16 draw).

Semi-finals
The draw for the semi-finals was held on 27 June 2022.

Final
The final was played on 10 September at Stade Hammadi Agrebi, Tunis.

See also
2021–22 Tunisian Ligue Professionnelle 1

References

External links
Fédération Tunisienne de Football

Tunisian Cup
1
2021–22 African domestic association football cups